Fanfare Island is the northernmost of the Argentine Islands, lying  south of Herald Reef in the Wilhelm Archipelago. It was named by the UK Antarctic Place-Names Committee in 1961 from association with Herald Reef.

See also 
 List of Antarctic and sub-Antarctic islands

References 

Islands of the Wilhelm Archipelago